Liwa is the capital of West Lampung Regency, Lampung province, Indonesia.

Liwa City Center, West Lampung Regency, Pesanggerahan established Sultan Kepaksian Paksi Pak Sekala Brak Palace Gedung Dalom in the 14th century AD. Kepaksian this is located at the foot of Mount Pesagi (the highest mountain in Lampung) which is the forerunner of the Lampung tribe today.

See also 
 1994 Liwa earthquake
 1933 Sumatra earthquake

References 

West Lampung Regency
Districts of Lampung
Regency seats of Lampung
Populated places in Lampung